Compliance Week, published by Wilmington plc, is a business intelligence service on corporate governance, risk, and compliance that features daily news and analysis, a quarterly print magazine, proprietary databases, industry events, and a variety of interactive features and forums.  

Founded in 2002, the organization is based in Boston, Massachusetts.

Endnotes

External links

2002 establishments in Massachusetts
Business magazines published in the United States
Magazines established in 2002
Magazines published in Boston
Regulation in the United States